Évron is a commune in the Mayenne department in north-western France. On 1 January 2019, the former communes Châtres-la-Forêt and Saint-Christophe-du-Luat were merged into Évron. Évron (pop. 8,700) is noted for the Basilica of Notre-Dame de l'Épine (12th century), formerly the church of the suppressed Évron Abbey, with 13th-century wall paintings and Aubusson tapestries. The nave and tower of the church date from the 11th century; the rest of the structure dates from the 18th century

Évron is the home to the largest Babybel Cheese factory globally and accounts for 18% of "Group Bel" global production.  The plant processes 650k litres of milk a day making the surrounding countryside heavily geared to milk production and the growing of winter feed for the dairy herds.

Population
The population data given in the table below refer to the commune in its geography as of January 2020.

International relations

Évron is twinned with:
 Hertford, United Kingdom
 Wildeshausen, Germany

See also
Communes of the Mayenne department

References

Communes of Mayenne
Maine (province)